Dennis Andries vs. Thomas Hearns was a professional boxing match contested on March 7, 1987, for the WBC light heavyweight title.

Background
In November 1986 2–division world champion Thomas Hearns had come to an agreement to face reigning WBC light heavyweight champion Dennis Andries. Hearns, who at the time had won world titles in both the welterweight and light middleweight divisions, decided to temporarily bypass an opportunity for a world title in the middleweight division and move up 15 pounds to the challenge for the light heavyweight title.

The fight was originally planned to take place on February 7 in Las Vegas, but Showtime, who owned the rights to broadcast the fight, chose to postpone the fight in hopes of instead scheduling it for a March 20 date in Hearns' native Detroit. Andries' manager was against postponing the fight to such a later date after Andries had already trained for the initial February date, as such the fight was moved to its final March 7 date.

The fight
Hearns would put forth one of his most dominating efforts as he scored six knockdowns over the overmatched Andries. After a mostly tactical first five rounds largely controlled by the challenger, Hearns would connect with a short right hand that dropped Andries for the first time and then was knocked down a further three times after numerous flurries by Hearns, though he was able to answer the referee's 10–count each time. As there is no three knockdown rule in effect during world title fights, Andries was able to continue the fight though Hearns would take a commanding lead on the scorecards with a rare 10–5 round. Hearns would send Andries down for the fifth time with a right hook in the ninth round, but Andries would quickly get back up once again. In the tenth round, Hearns dropped Andries for the sixth and final time after ducking a wild swing by Andries and countering with a short right hand of his own. Andries was able to get back up, but the referee stopped the fight as Andries was too dazed to continue.

Aftermath
Hearns reign as light heavyweight champion would be brief as he announced after the fight that he would go down in weight to challenge for a world title in the middleweight division stating "I want that fourth title" In his next fight Hearns would make history, becoming the first fighter to claim world titles in four different weight classes after knocking out Juan Roldán to claim the WBC middleweight title.

Andries would rebound from his loss to Hearns and would reclaim the WBC light heavyweight title after defeating Tony Willis 2 years later in 1989. After losing the title to Jeff Harding in his first defense, Andries would become capture his third light heavyweight title after knocking out Harding in their rematch, joining only Marvin Johnson at the time as the only three–time world champion in the light heavyweight division.

Fight card

References

1987 in boxing
Boxing matches
1987 in sports in Michigan
Boxing on Showtime
Boxing in Michigan
March 1987 sports events in the United States